Tereza Kerndlová (born 6 October 1986 in Brno) is a Czech singer. She rose to fame as a member of the trio Black Milk since 2001. After the trio split in 2005, she started a solo career and released the album Orchidej.
 
She represented the Czech Republic in the Eurovision Song Contest 2008 with the song "Have Some Fun", which was written by Gordon Pogoda (who wrote 4 songs on her album Have Some Fun) and Stano Simor (who produced the album).  It was performed in the second semi-final on 22 May and finished 18th of 19 entrants with nine points.

Discography

Studio albums
Orchidej (2006)
Have Some Fun (2007)
Retro (2008)
Schody z nebe (2011)
Singles Collection (2013)

Notes

External links

 The Tereza Kerndlová Homepage

1986 births
Living people
Eurovision Song Contest entrants for the Czech Republic
21st-century Czech women singers
Eurovision Song Contest entrants of 2008
Musicians from Brno
Czech pop singers